The 2021 All-Ireland Under-20 Hurling Championship final was a hurling match that was played on 18 August 2021 to determine the winners of the 2021 All-Ireland Under-20 Hurling Championship, the 58th season of the All-Ireland Under-20 Hurling Championship, a tournament organised by the Gaelic Athletic Association for the champion teams of Leinster and Munster. The final was contested by Cork of Munster and Galway of Leinster.

The All-Ireland final between Cork and Galway was the third All-Ireland final meeting between the two teams and a first since 1998. Cork were hoping to claim a record 13th All-Ireland title and a second successive title, while Galway were hoping to claim their first title since 2011.

Cork dominated the opening exchanges and led by 1-04 to 0-00 after ten minutes with Darragh Flynn scoring a penalty after three minutes. Cork went eight points ahead before Donal O'Shea got Galway's first score with a free after 14 minutes. He followed with another free directly afterwards but then Galway failed to clear their lines and Jack Cahalane scored Cork's second goal to lead by 2-05 to 0-02 at the first water break. A save from Galway goalkeeper Paddy Rabbitte denied Daniel Hogan a third Cork goal, however, they still ended the half leading by 2-09 to 0-05.

Galway reduced the margin to 2-09 to 0-09 after just five minutes of the second half. The gap was reduced to three when Donal O’Shea scored Galway's first goal after 37 minutes.
Almost immediately Cork responded with a Pádraig Power goal. Cork had a six-point lead at the second water break but dominated the final quarter. After scoring seven points during that period they ended the game with a fourth goal, scored by Brian Hayes.

Cork's All-Ireland victory was their second in succession. The win gave them their 13th All-Ireland title overall and put them further ahead in pole position on the all-time roll of honour.

Match

Details

References

2021 in hurling
All-Ireland Under-21 Hurling Championship Finals
Cork GAA matches
Galway GAA matches